Leandro Almeida da Silva (born 19 January 1977 in Volta Redonda, Rio de Janeiro), known simply as Leandro, is a Brazilian retired footballer who played as a striker.

External links

1977 births
Living people
People from Volta Redonda
Brazilian footballers
Association football forwards
Volta Redonda FC players
Liga Portugal 2 players
Segunda Divisão players
SC Vianense players
U.S.C. Paredes players
C.D. Feirense players
Gondomar S.C. players
A.D. Ovarense players
G.D. Estoril Praia players
G.D. Chaves players
F.C. Vizela players
G.D. Ribeirão players
Louletano D.C. players
F.C. Tirsense players
Brazilian expatriate footballers
Expatriate footballers in Portugal
Brazilian expatriate sportspeople in Portugal
Sportspeople from Rio de Janeiro (state)